(born October 27, 1974) is a Japanese mixed martial artist who competes in the light heavyweight division. Namekawa made his Mixed martial arts debut for Fighting Network Rings in 1998. He fought in mainly Shoot fighting bouts until 1999 when Rings introduced the King of King Rules. Throughout his career, Namekawa has fought for organisations such as Rings, Deep and Pride FC. His last fight to date was in 2008, with a professional Mixed martial arts career spanning ten years.

Namekawa has fought notable opponents such as; Alistair Overeem, Volk Han, Maurício Rua and Cyrille Diabate. He holds a professional MMA Record of 25 wins, 16 losses and 4 draws.

Fight career

Fighting Network RINGS (1998-2002)
Namekawa made his debut for RINGS on June 20, 1998 against Minoru Toyonaga, the bout ended in a draw. He then went on to submit Daniel Higgins and out point Ryuki Ueyama. Namekawa suffered his first loss on October 11, 1998 against Bakouri Gogitidze, he lost by submission. On October 23, 1998, Namekawa lost to Masayuki Naruse by submission at 4:50 of round 1. He ended the year with a draw against British fighter, Lee Hasdell. On January 23, 1999, Namekawa had a rematch with Hasdell, this time Hasdell was docked a point for an illegal punch. Namekawa won by decision.
On March 7, 1999, Namekawa had their third and final match, this time in Milton Keynes, England at Night of the Samurai 3. Hasdell won by KO in 5:55 of round 1.

During the rest of 1999, Namekawa picked up victories over fighters, Troy Ittensohn, Ryuki Ueyama, Sara Umer and Minoru Toyonaga. Also losing to Wataru Sakata, Ryuki Ueyama and Koba Tkeshelashvili. The year 2000 was a bad year for Namekawa as he failed to pick up a single win, losing to, Willie Peeters, Chris Haseman, Alistair Overeem and Volk Han.

2001 would be the complete opposite to the previous year as Namekawa was victorious in 4 out of 5 fights. He defeated Takashi Sonoda, Wataru Imamura, Masutatsu Yano and Dexter Casey, all by submission. On October 20, 2001, Namekawa lost to Egidijus Valavicius by TKO. 

Yasuhito Namekawa's final fight for RINGS was on February 15, 2002, on the final ever Rings event. He was submitted by Sam Nest at 4:53 of round 2.

Deep (2002-2004) 
On March 30, 2002, Namekawa made his Deep debut at Deep - 4th Impact. He defeated Daisuke Watanabe by majority decision. He went on to win his next two fights in Deep with submission wins over Makoto Miyazawa and Yuki Ishikawa. On December 31, 2002, he lost to Wallid Ismail by decision at Inoki Bom-Ba-Ye 2002. Namekawa ended the year with a 3-1 record with Deep. He began 2003 with a draw with Osami Shibuya at Deep - 8th Impact. Namekawa did not fight again until January 22, 2004. He defeated Yusuke Imamura by TKO at Deep - 13th Impact.

Pride FC (2004)
On February 15, 2004, Namekawa made his Pride FC debut with a submission win over Egidijus Valavicius at Pride Bushido 2. He returned to Pride on October 14, 2004, he was defeated by Maurício Rua.

Return to Deep (2005-2008)
In his second outing in the Deep organisation, Namekawa beat Kenji Akiyama by TKO, Jong Hyuk Moon by submission and lost to Ryuta Sakurai. He also drew with Jeong Ho Lee on December 2, 2005. On April 11, 2006, Namekawa was defeated by Cyrille Diabate by KO at Deep - 24 Impact.

Namekawa beat Peter Iryaku at VFX - Vale Tudo Fighters Mexico before losing to Cyrille Diabate in a rematch on July 30, 2006. He then defeated Mu Jin Na by submission.

Upon returning to Deep, Namekawa remained undefeated during the rest of his time there. Drawing with Fabiano Capoani and defeating Yuji Sakuragi, Hamish Robertson, Katsuhisa Fujii, Carlos Toyota and Claudio Silva. Namekawa's last fight to date was against Katsuyori Shibata at Deep - 38 Impact on October 23, 2008. The fight ended in a draw.

Mixed martial arts record

|-
| Draw
| align=center| 25-16-4
| Katsuyori Shibata
| Draw
| Deep: 38 Impact
| 
| align=center| 3
| align=center| 5:00
| Tokyo, Japan
| 
|-
| Win
| align=center| 25-16-3
| Cláudio Silva
| Submission (armbar)
| Deep: 37 Impact
| 
| align=center| 1
| align=center| 2:59
| Tokyo, Japan
| 
|-
| Win
| align=center| 24-16-3
| Carlos Toyota
| Submission (achilles lock)
| Deep: 34 Impact
| 
| align=center| 1
| align=center| 2:58
| Tokyo, Japan
| 
|-
| Win
| align=center| 23-16-3
| Katsuhisa Fujii
| Decision (majority)
| Deep: 32 Impact
| 
| align=center| 2
| align=center| 5:00
| Tokyo, Japan
| 
|-
| Win
| align=center| 22-16-3
| Hamish Robertson
| Submission (half crab lock)
| Deep: Glove
| 
| align=center| 1
| align=center| 1:06
| Tokyo, Japan
| 
|-
| Win
| align=center| 21-16-3
| Yuji Sakuragi
| Submission (heel hook)
| Deep: 29 Impact
| 
| align=center| 1
| align=center| 2:12
| Tokyo, Japan
| 
|-
| Draw
| align=center| 20-16-3
| Fabiano Capoani
| Draw
| Deep: 28 Impact
| 
| align=center| 2
| align=center| 5:00
| Tokyo, Japan
| 
|-
| Win
| align=center| 20-16-2
| Mu Jin Na
| Submission (armbar)
| Heat: Heat 2
| 
| align=center| 1
| align=center| 1:45
| Aichi, Japan
| 
|-
| Loss
| align=center| 19-16-2
| Cyrille Diabaté
| KO (flying knee)
| Real Rhythm: 4th Stage
| 
| align=center| 2
| align=center| 1:50
| Osaka, Japan
| 
|-
| Win
| align=center| 19-15-2
| Peter Iryaku
| KO
| VFX: Vale Tudo Fighters Mexico
| 
| align=center| 2
| align=center| 1:00
| Tláhuac, Mexico
| 
|-
| Loss
| align=center| 18-15-2
| Cyrille Diabaté
| KO (punches)
| Deep: 24 Impact
| 
| align=center| 2
| align=center| 2:22
| Tokyo, Japan
| 
|-
| Draw
| align=center| 18-14-2
| Jeong Ho Lee
| Draw
| Deep: 22 Impact
| 
| align=center| 2
| align=center| 5:00
| Tokyo, Japan
| 
|-
| Win
| align=center| 18-14-1
| Jong Hyuk Moon
| Submission (forearm choke)
| Deep: 21st Impact
| 
| align=center| 1
| align=center| 2:33
| Tokyo, Japan
| 
|-
| Loss
| align=center| 17-14-1
| Ryuta Sakurai
| Submission (armbar)
| Deep: 19th Impact
| 
| align=center| 1
| align=center| 4:40
| Tokyo, Japan
| 
|-
| Win
| align=center| 17-13-1
| Kenji Akiyama
| TKO (punches)
| Deep: Hero 1
| 
| align=center| 1
| align=center| 3:48
| Nagoya, Aichi, Japan
| 
|-
| Loss
| align=center| 16-13-1
| Maurício Rua
| TKO (punches)
| Pride Bushido 5
| 
| align=center| 1
| align=center| 6:02
| Osaka, Japan
| 
|-
| Win
| align=center| 16-12-1
| Fabiano Capoani
| DQ (knee to the groin)
| Gladiator FC: Day 1
| 
| align=center| 2
| align=center| 1:07
| South Korea
| 
|-
| Win
| align=center| 15-12-1
| Egidijus Valavicius
| Submission (guillotine choke)
| Pride Bushido 2
| 
| align=center| 1
| align=center| 1:05
| Yokohama, Kanagawa, Japan
| 
|-
| Win
| align=center| 14-12-1
| Yusuke Imamura
| TKO (punches)
| Deep: 13th Impact
| 
| align=center| 2
| align=center| 3:22
| Tokyo, Japan
| 
|-
| Draw
| align=center| 13-12-1
| Osami Shibuya
| Draw
| Deep: 8th Impact
| 
| align=center| 3
| align=center| 5:00
| Tokyo, Japan
| 
|-
| Loss
| align=center| 13-12
| Wallid Ismail
| Decision (unanimous)
| Inoki Bom-Ba-Ye 2002: K-1 vs. Inoki
| 
| align=center| 3
| align=center| 5:00
| Saitama, Japan
| 
|-
| Win
| align=center| 13-11
|Yuki Ishikawa
| Submission (punches)
| Deep: 7th Impact
| 
| align=center| 1
| align=center| 3:46
| Tokyo, Japan
| 
|-
| Win
| align=center| 12-11
| Makoto Miyazawa
| Submission (guillotine choke)
| Deep: 6th Impact
| 
| align=center| 3
| align=center| 2:37
| Tokyo, Japan
| 
|-
| Win
| align=center| 11-11
| Daisuke Watanabe
| Decision (majority)
| Deep: 4th Impact
| 
| align=center| 3
| align=center| 5:00
| Nagoya, Aichi, Japan
| 
|-
| Loss
| align=center| 10-11
| Sam Nest
| Submission (rear-naked choke)
| Rings: World Title Series Grand Final
| 
| align=center| 2
| align=center| 4:53
| Yokohama, Kanagawa, Japan
| 
|-
| Loss
| align=center| 10-10
| Egidijus Valavicius
| TKO (towel)
| Rings: World Title Series 4
| 
| align=center| 1
| align=center| 2:18
| Tokyo, Japan
| 
|-
| Win
| align=center| 10-9
| Dexter Casey
| Submission (guillotine choke)
| Rings: Battle Genesis Vol. 8
| 
| align=center| 1
| align=center| 1:44
| Tokyo, Japan
| 
|-
| Win
| align=center| 9-9
| Masutatsu Yano
| Submission (guillotine choke)
| Rings: World Title Series 2
| 
| align=center| 2
| align=center| 0:22
| Tokyo, Japan
| 
|-
| Win
| align=center| 8-9
| Hiroshi Imamura
| Submission (kneebar)
| Rings: World Title Series 1
| 
| align=center| 1
| align=center| 1:48
| Tokyo, Japan
| 
|-
| Win
| align=center| 7-9
| Takashi Sonoda
| Submission (armbar)
| Rings: Battle Genesis Vol. 7
| 
| align=center| 1
| align=center| 0:43
| Tokyo, Japan
| 
|-
| Loss
| align=center| 6-9
| Chris Haseman
| Submission (kimura)
| Rings USA: Rising Stars Final
| 
| align=center| 1
| align=center| 1:30
| Moline, Illinois, United States
| 
|-
| Win
| align=center| 6-8
| Chris Munsen
| Decision (majority)
| Rings USA: Rising Stars Block B
| 
| align=center| 2
| align=center| 5:00
| Honolulu, Hawaii, United States
| 
|-
| Win
| align=center| 5-8
| Falaniko Vitale
| Submission (guillotine choke)
| Rings USA: Rising Stars Block B
| 
| align=center| 2
| align=center| 0:27
| Honolulu, Hawaii, United States
| 
|-
| Loss
| align=center| 4-8
| Volk Han
| Decision
| Rings Russia: Russia vs. The World
| 
| align=center| 3
| align=center| 5:00
| Yekaterinburg, Sverdlovsk Oblast, Russia
| 
|-
| Loss
| align=center| 4-7
| Alistair Overeem
| Submission (armbar)
| Rings: Millennium Combine 1
| 
| align=center| 1
| align=center| 0:45
| Tokyo, Japan
| 
|-
| Loss
| align=center| 4-6
| Chris Haseman
| Submission (guillotine choke)
| Rings Australia: NR 4
| 
| align=center| 1
| align=center| 6:50
| Brisbane, Queensland, Australia
| 
|-
| Loss
| align=center| 4-5
| Willie Peeters
| TKO (knee to the body)
| Rings Holland: There Can Only Be One Champion
| 
| align=center| 2
| align=center| 4:56
| Utrecht City, Netherlands
| 
|-
| Loss
| align=center| 4-4
| Koba Tkeshelashvili
| Submission (rear-naked choke)
| Rings: Rings Georgia
| 
| align=center| 1
| align=center| 6:15
| Georgia (country)
| 
|-
| Loss
| align=center| 4-3
| Ryuki Ueyama
| Decision (lost points)
| Rings: Rise 5th
| 
| align=center| 3
| align=center| 5:00
| Japan
| 
|-
| Win
| align=center| 4-2
| Minoru Toyonaga
| Submission (guillotine choke)
| Rings: Rise 4th
| 
| align=center| 1
| align=center| 9:51
| Japan
| 
|-
| Win
| align=center| 3-2
| Sara Umer
| Submission (rear-naked choke)
| Rings: Rise 3rd
| 
| align=center| 1
| align=center| 3:09
| Japan
| 
|-
| Loss
| align=center| 2-2
| Chris Haseman
| Submission (arm-triangle choke)
| Rings: Rise 1st
| 
| align=center| 1
| align=center| 7:42
| Japan
| 
|-
| Loss
| align=center| 2-1
| Lee Hasdell
| KO (knee)
| NOTS 3: Night of the Samurai 3
| 
| align=center| 2
| align=center| N/A
| Milton Keynes, England
| 
|-
| Win
| align=center| 2-0
| Ryuki Ueyama
| Decision
| Rings: Final Capture
| 
| align=center| 3
| align=center| 5:00
| Japan
| 
|-
| Win
| align=center| 1-0
| Troy Ittensohn
| TKO
| Rings: Fourth Fighting Integration
| 
| align=center| 2
| align=center| 1:43
| Tokyo, Japan
|

References

External links

 Mixed Martial Arts Record
 RINGS Shoot Fighting History

1974 births
Living people
Japanese male mixed martial artists
Light heavyweight mixed martial artists
Mixed martial artists utilizing wrestling
Japanese male professional wrestlers